is a former Japanese football player.

Club statistics

References

External links

1983 births
Living people
Tokyo Gakugei University alumni
Association football people from Shizuoka Prefecture
Japanese footballers
J2 League players
Yokohama FC players
Mito HollyHock players
SC Sagamihara players
Association football midfielders